Abhishek Banerjee may refer to:
 Abhishek Banerjee (politician) (born 1987), Indian politician
 Abhishek Banerjee (actor) (born 1988), Indian actor and casting director

See also
 Abhisek Banerjee (born 1984), Indian cricketer